The first seeded Chan Hao-ching and Chan Yung-jan won the first edition of this tournament, defeating Irina Buryachok and Valeria Solovieva in the final, 6–0, 7–5.

Seeds

Draw

Draw

References
 Main Draw

WTA Shenzhen Open - Doubles
2013 Doubles